Puccini  is a 1953 Italian biographical musical melodrama film directed by Carmine Gallone. It stars actor Gabriele Ferzetti in the role of Giacomo Puccini.

Plot 
The film narrates the composer's life full of loves and recklessness, starting from the youthful period in which, after falling in love with Cristina who had helped him achieve success, he convinces Elvira, a mild-mannered girl from the provinces, to follow him to Milan. Elvira soon gives him a son and remains close to him despite her betrayals. Cristina, who has now become a famous soprano, reappears again in the life of the master and tries to distance him from her partner but, after the triumph of La bohème, driven by her gratitude towards Elvira, Giacomo decides to marry her. This does not mean that her infidelities end and Elvira, increasingly alone, decides to separate from her husband. The episode of the suicide of a young maid madly in love with him and the sensational failure of Madama Butterfly upset Puccini's life: Elvira at this point reconciles with him and stays by his side assisting him generously until his death, which occurred from an incurable disease which strikes him during the composition of Turandot.

Distribution 
The distribution in Italy took place from April 29, 1953; in the same year the film entered the cinema circuit in West Germany and, from the following year, in other countries (in East Germany the film was released in 1955).

In some distributions the title adopted was: Puccini, I lived with art, I lived with love. In France it was distributed under the title: Trois amours de Puccini.

Cast
Gabriele Ferzetti: Giacomo Puccini
Märta Torén: Elvira Puccini
Nadia Gray: Cristina Vernini
Paolo Stoppa: Giocondo
Myriam Bru: Delia
Sergio Tofano: Giulio Ricordi
Mimo Billi: Fanelli
Silvio Bagolini: Gianni
Alessandro Fersen: Padre di Delia
Jacques Famery: Antonio Puccini
Carlo Duse: Arrigo Boito
Piero Palermini: Ferdinando Fontana
Oscar Andriani: Giuseppe Giacosa
René Clermont: Luigi Illica
Mario Feliciani: Enrico
Renato Chiantoni: Filippo Tacchi
Attilio Dottesio: Sampieri

References

External links

1953 films
Italian historical drama films
1950s Italian-language films
Films about classical music and musicians
Films about composers
Biographical films about musicians
Films directed by Carmine Gallone
1950s historical drama films
Giacomo Puccini
Films set in the 1870s
Films set in the 1880s
Films set in the 1890s
Films set in the 1900s
Films set in the 1910s
Films set in the 1920s
Melodrama films
Italian musical drama films
1950s musical drama films
1950s Italian films
Cultural depictions of Italian men